Nairn and Cawdor is one of the 21 wards used to elect members of the Highland Council. It elects four Councillors.

Councillors

2022 Election

Election Results
2022 Highland Council election

2017 Election
2017 Highland Council election

References

Highland council wards
Inverness